In human anatomy, the iliac arteries are three arteries located in the region of the ilium in the pelvis:
Common iliac artery – forms at terminus of the aorta
External iliac artery – forms where the common iliac artery bifurcates, continues as the femoral artery at the inguinal ligament
Internal iliac artery – forms where the common iliac artery bifurcates, supplies the perineum and sexual organs.

See also 
 Iliac vein

Arteries
Perineum
Pelvis